Center Township may refer to the following places in the U.S. state of Missouri:

 Center Township, Buchanan County, Missouri
 Center Township, Dade County, Missouri
 Center Township, Hickory County, Missouri
 Center Township, Knox County, Missouri
 Center Township, McDonald County, Missouri
 Center Township, Ralls County, Missouri
 Center Township, St. Clair County, Missouri
 Center Township, Vernon County, Missouri

See also
Center Township (disambiguation)

Missouri township disambiguation pages